Fernand Gabriel Cahours called Gabriel Rosca, (8 September 1895 – 4 September 1943), was a French actor, screenwriter and film director of Italian descent.

Filmography 
Actor
1920 : The Shadow, by Roberto Roberti
 1920 : Mademoiselle from Armentieres by Maurice Elvey
1921 : L'Aviateur masqué, by Robert Péguy as Hoffer
1926 : The Triumph of the Rat, by Graham Cutts as the Apache danceur
1926 : Mademoiselle d'Armentières, by Maurice Elvey as Carl Branz
1927 : Le Chemin de la rémission / Calvaire (Drumul iertarii), by Gabriel Rosca and Ion Niculescu-Bruna as Jean Bernard

Director
1927 : Le Chemin de la rémission / Calvaire (Drumul iertarii), by Gabriel Rosca and Ion Niculescu-Bruna
1928 : Jim Hackett champion
1932 : Rocambole
1935 : La Coqueluche de ces dames
1938 : La Marraine du régiment by Jean Gobet

Screenwriter
1932 : Rocambole, after the novel by Ponson du Terrail

References

External links 
Fiche Cinéma-français

French male film actors
French film directors
20th-century French screenwriters
Mass media people from Marseille
1895 births
1943 deaths